Corpus Christi International Airport  is  west of Corpus Christi, in Nueces County, Texas.

The airport's six-gate  Hayden Wilson Head Terminal, designed by Gensler, opened on November 3, 2002, with a theme of "When the Sun Meets the Sea."

The Corpus Christi International Airport has tried to attract airline service from Mexico, the latest attempt being in 2005. It had reached an agreement with Mexican airline Aeromar which planned to fly ATR 42s two or three times a week to Monterrey and had received U.S. Department of Transportation (USDOT) approval. However, in a later letter to USDOT, Aeromar stated it would not seek renewal of the permit. Aeromar serves McAllen, TX, with nonstop flights to Mexico City. In 1974, Texas International Airlines was flying Douglas DC-9-10s between Corpus Christi and Mexico City via McAllen, TX, and DC-9s twice a week to Tampico and Veracruz via McAllen in 1975. In 1967, Mexicana de Aviacion Douglas DC-6s flew direct to Mexico City via Monterrey three days a week.

With the arrival of the Chautauqua Airlines operating United Express flights with Canadair CRJ200 regional jets via a code sharing agreement with United Airlines (with Chautauqua operating a number of United Express flights into the airport at the time), the airline established a crew base with about 75 pilots and flight attendants in Corpus Christi. However, Chautauqua then closed this crew base in November 2008 with the airline  ceasing to operate United Express flights from Corpus Christi. In May 2016, all United Express flights at Corpus Christi were being operated by Mesa Airlines with Embraer ERJ-175 regional jets or by ExpressJet with Embraer ERJ-145 regional jets.

The Dallas Love Field-Corpus Christi nonstop route operated by Southwest Airlines began on August 10, 2019, with one daily round-trip flight between the cities each Saturday. Southwest last flew the route nonstop in 1986.

Corpus Christi International Airport is included in the Federal Aviation Administration (FAA) National Plan of Integrated Airport Systems for 2019–2023, in which it is categorized as a non-hub primary commercial service facility.

Facilities

In 2017, the airport had 97,012 aircraft operations, an average of 266 per day: 66% military, 18% general aviation, 8% air taxi, and 8% commercial airline. In April 2020, there were 65 aircraft based at this airport: 28 single-engine, 24 multi-engine, 9 jets, 3 helicopters, and 1 glider.

Airlines and destinations
Corpus Christi International Airport has six gates, two of which (Gates 4 and 6) have direct access to the U.S. Customs office. The airport has five jetways with the sixth gate using stairs to reach the aircraft parking ramp.

Passenger

Cargo

Top destinations

American Airlines August 2017 schedules listed all of its nonstop service to Dallas/Fort Worth (DFW) being operated by American Eagle with Canadair CRJ-900s flown by Mesa Airlines. Earlier in 2017, American was operating a daily McDonnell Douglas MD-80 flight which then discontinued; daily McDonnell Douglas MD-80 mainline service operated by American then resumed in the summer of 2018.

All Southwest Airlines flights at Corpus Christi are flown with various Boeing 737 models; Southwest is the only airline to serve Corpus Christi with year-round mainline jet service while American Airlines (AA) and United Airlines (UA) operate seasonal mainline jet flights, AA to Dallas/FortWorth, and UA to Houston/IAH.

The United Airlines May 2, 2016 flight status listings show all United Express flights to Houston George Bush Intercontinental Airport on Mesa Airlines Embraer ERJ-175s or ExpressJet Embraer ERJ-145s at the time. On June 7, 2018, United Airlines began flying daily Airbus A319 mainline jet service to Houston (IAH); however, this service was later suspended and is now flown once again by United Express.

Past airline service

Braniff International Airways, Eastern Air Lines, Pan American World Airways (Pan Am) and Trans-Texas Airways (predecessor of Texas International Airlines) all served Corpus Christi's old and new airports over the years.

In 1935, Braniff Lockheed Model 10 Electras flew Brownsville - Corpus Christi - San Antonio - Austin - Waco - Fort Worth - Dallas Love Field. In 1940, a Braniff Douglas DC-3 flew Brownsville - Corpus Christi - San Antonio - Austin - Fort Worth - Dallas Love Field - Oklahoma City - Ponca City, OK - Wichita - Kansas City - Chicago.

Eastern arrived at Corpus Christi in April 1939 with direct DC-3 flights from New York Newark Airport via a number of enroute stops with this service connecting to Pan Am's flight to Mexico City. In 1958, Eastern Convair 440s flew Brownsville - Corpus Christi - Houston Hobby - Beaumont/Port Arthur - Lake Charles - Lafayette - Baton Rouge - New Orleans - Mobile - Pensacola - Montgomery - Birmingham - Atlanta.

Pan American World Airways (Pan Am) was flying Douglas DC-3s between Houston and Mexico City via Corpus Christi in 1947 with a daily roundtrip routing of Houston Hobby Airport (HOU) - Corpus Christi - Brownsville - Tampico - Mexico City with the airline having a name for this international service, being the "Sun Ray Clipper".  According to the November 1, 1947 Pan Am system timetable, the southbound "Sun Ray Clipper" flight overnighted in Mexico City and then operated continuing service the next day on a southbound routing of Mexico City - Guatemala City, Guatemala - Managua, Nicaragua - San Jose, Costa Rica - Balboa, Panama with return northbound service from Balboa to Houston via Corpus Christi being operated on the same routing in reverse with an overnight stop being made in Mexico City as well.  However, Pan Am was no longer serving Corpus Christi by 1950 although the airline would return to the airport with jet service by the mid 1980s.

Trans-Texas Airways (TTa) arrived in 1950; in 1952, its Douglas DC-3s flew a multi-stop routing of Brownsville - Harlingen - McAllen - Alice - Corpus Christi - Beeville - Victoria - Houston. By 1963, most TTa flights to the airport were operated with Convair 240s direct to Houston, Dallas, San Antonio, Austin, Fort Worth, Harlingen, McAllen, and Victoria; TTa DC-3s also flew a routing of Corpus Christi - San Antonio - San Angelo - Midland/Odessa - Pecos - El Paso.  By 1969, TTa had changed its name to Texas International Airlines, which continued to serve Corpus Christi with McDonnell Douglas DC-9 jet service

Scheduled jets arrived in the spring of 1965: Eastern Boeing 727-100s to Houston Hobby Airport and Braniff BAC One-Elevens to Houston Hobby Airport and San Antonio (in 1965, the runway was still 5600 feet.) In 1966, Braniff was operating Lockheed L-188 Electra propjets on a routing of Corpus Christi - Houston Hobby Airport - Dallas Love Field - Oklahoma City - Wichita - Kansas City - Chicago O'Hare Airport. Also in 1966, Trans-Texas Airways introduced nonstop Douglas DC-9-10 jet service to Houston Hobby Airport in addition to Convair 600 turboprop flights nonstop to Houston, San Antonio, and Harlingen. In 1968, TTa was operating nonstop DC-9 jet service to both Harlingen and Houston Hobby Airport.

In 1966-67 Mexicana de Aviacion, a Mexican-based air carrier, was operating Douglas DC-6 propliners on nonstop international service to Monterrey, Mexico three days a week with this flight then continuing on to Mexico City.

Following its name change from Trans-Texas Airways (TTa), in 1974 Texas International Airlines was operating daily DC-9 jet service between Corpus Christi and Mexico City via McAllen as well as direct DC-9 flights to Denver and Salt Lake City via Houston Intercontinental Airport (IAH) or San Antonio. Also in 1974, three airlines were operating nonstop jet service to Houston (IAH):  Braniff Boeing 727-100s and 727-200s, Eastern Boeing 727-200s, and Texas International Douglas DC-9-10s with Braniff 727s also flying nonstop to Dallas/Fort Worth International Airport (DFW).

The February 1, 1976 Official Airline Guide (OAG) lists Eastern Boeing 727-200s from Corpus Christi nonstop to New Orleans and also nonstop to Houston with both flights continuing on to Atlanta. Also in 1976, Braniff was operating three direct Boeing 727 flights a day to Chicago O'Hare, all via Dallas/Fort Worth. The same year, Texas International DC-9s flew direct to Los Angeles (LAX) via stops in Houston, Dallas/Fort Worth, Midland/Odessa, Roswell, NM, and Albuquerque.

Southwest Airlines began serving Corpus Christi on March 1, 1977, as an intrastate airline and in 1979 was operating six Boeing 737-200s a day nonstop to Houston Hobby Airport (HOU); it also flew nonstop to Dallas Love Field on weekends. In 1979, Braniff had ended nonstop service to Houston but was flying four nonstop 727s a day to Dallas/Fort Worth while Eastern 727s and Texas International DC-9s still flew nonstop to Houston Intercontinental (IAH). In 1981, Eastern McDonnell Douglas DC-9-30s flew nonstop to Atlanta.

In 1982, Braniff International went out of business while Texas International was merged into Continental Airlines. American Airlines arrived in 1981; in 1983, American Boeing 727-100s and 727-200s flew nonstop to Dallas/Fort Worth (DFW) with a total of three flights a day with an American 727-200 also flying to DFW via a stop in Austin. Continental had four daily 727 and DC-9 nonstops to Houston Intercontinental (IAH) while Pan Am Express operated by Emerald Air via a code sharing agreement with Pan Am operated three Douglas DC-9-10s a day to IAH. By 1984, Austin-based Emerald Air was operating as an independent carrier with up to ten DC-9 jet and Fairchild Hiller FH-227 turboprop departures a day nonstop to Dallas/Fort Worth (DFW), Houston (IAH), and McAllen.

United Airlines arrived in 1984 but then pulled out in 1987; in 1985, United was operating two direct flights a day to Denver with both services making a stop in Austin with Boeing 727-100s and 727-200s being flown on the route. United would return to Corpus Christi following its merger with Continental Airlines.

Pan Am returned to Corpus Christi in 1985 but then discontinued its flights in 1986; its Boeing 727-200s first operated Corpus Christi - Dallas/Fort Worth - New York Kennedy Airport (JFK) service with the airline subsequently operating Corpus Christi - Houston Intercontinental - Washington Dulles Airport (IAD) flights.  Also in 1985, Eastern was operating a daily Boeing 727-200 service on a routing of Corpus Christi - San Antonio - Atlanta - New York LaGuardia Airport - Montreal; however, Eastern had pulled out of Corpus Christi by 1987.

In 1989, American Airlines had five daily McDonnell Douglas MD-80 nonstops to Dallas/Fort Worth while Continental and Continental Express were operating a total of six nonstops a day to Houston Intercontinental (Continental with Boeing 727-100s, 727-200s and Douglas DC-9-10s, and Continental Express with Britt Airways ATR 42s) while Southwest was flying eight nonstops a day to Houston Hobby with Boeing 737-200s and 737-300s.

Delta Air Lines arrived in 1990. In 1991, Delta had three Boeing 737-200s a day nonstop to its Dallas/Fort Worth hub, while American, and American Eagle had a total of seven nonstops a day to DFW, American with MD-80s and American Eagle with Saab 340s. In 1993, Delta turned its Corpus Christi-Dallas/Fort Worth service over to Delta Connection flown by Atlantic Southeast Airlines ATR 72s and Embraer EMB-120 Brasilia turboprops operated via a code sharing agreement with Delta while American was operating Fokker 100 jets to DFW until 1995-96 when American Eagle ATR 72 turboprops took over. In 1999, Delta Connection operated by Atlantic Southeast Airlines Canadair CRJ-200 regional jets were flying nonstop to Atlanta. Also in 1999, Continental was operating one mainline jet flight a day to Houston Intercontinental (IAH) while Continental Express flying nine nonstops a day to Houston (IAH) with Embraer ERJ-145 regional jets and ATR 42 turboprops. In 2010 Continental merged with United Airlines and the Continental Express service from Corpus Christi then began to be operated as United Express.

In 1970, Rio Airways, which was operating as an independent commuter air carrier at the time, was based in Corpus Christi where it operated a hub with nonstop service to the Texas cities of Austin, Brownsville, Houston, Laredo, McAllen and San Antonio flown with Beechcraft 99 turboprops.

Several other independent commuter airlines served Corpus Christi from the 1970s to the 1990s with small turboprop and prop aircraft, including

 Austin Express operating Fairchild Swearingen Metroliners
 Conquest Airlines operating Beechcraft 1900Cs and Fairchild Swearingen Metroliners
 Metro Airlines operating Short 330s
 Tejas Airlines operating Fairchild Swearingen Metroliners and Piper Navajos
 Texas National Airlines operating Piper Navajos

Incidents at Corpus Christi Airport
On April 2, 2012, United Airlines Flight 4128 operated by United Express made an emergency landing at Corpus Christi International Airport after it suffered damage to its front landing gear and experienced a flat tire. The flight originated in Harlingen, Texas, and was en route to George Bush Intercontinental Airport in Houston with 37 passengers on board. No injuries were reported. The aircraft was an Embraer ERJ 145 regional jet flown by ExpressJet.

References

External links

Airport Technology Article on CCIA – New Terminal Construction

Airports in Texas
Airport
Transportation in Nueces County, Texas
Buildings and structures in Corpus Christi, Texas